State Route 371 (abbreviated SR 371) is a very short secondary state highway in western Lauderdale County, Tennessee. This highway begins and also ends at SR 87. SR 371 passes through the small communities of Pleasant Hill and Cherry. The entire route of SR 371 is a rural two-lane highway.

History
This highway was once signed as State Route 87A (SR 87A) "From a point on SR 87  at Cherry to a point on SR 87 east of Gimp" as evidenced on Page 58 of the "History of the Tennessee Highway Department".

Major intersections

References

Tennessee Department of Transportation
Lauderdale County Highway Map
Tennessee Official Transportation Map

371
Transportation in Lauderdale County, Tennessee